The 2017–18 Indiana Hoosiers men's basketball team represented Indiana University in the 2017–18 NCAA Division I men's basketball season. Their head coach was Archie Miller, his first year as Indiana head coach. The team played its home games at Simon Skjodt Assembly Hall in Bloomington, Indiana, as a member of the Big Ten Conference. The season officially kicked off with its annual event, Hoosier Hysteria, on October 21, 2017.

For Miller, his first season at IU wouldn't be so much of a rebuilding job, as it would be a major remodeling job; starting with laying the foundation of a pack-line defense and valuing possessions. Early in the season, Miller stated practices were 75% defense, 25% offense. That scheme showed early and often, as the Hoosiers struggled mightily throughout the season to find any flow or rhythm on offense, despite the defense making leaps and bounds in the overall rankings of Division 1 basketball (final ranking of number one in the Big Ten Conference). As the season progressed toward its end, the Hoosiers bought into Miller's defense, which led to better offense. With a surprising early second round loss in the 2018 Big Ten tournament to Rutgers, 67–76, and losing enough games to keep them out of the NCAA tournament and NIT, including an early few they should have won against Indiana State and IPFW, IU's first season under their new coach came to a disappointing close. They finished with an overall record of 16–15 and 9–9 in the Big Ten.

Previous season
Despite the highs of the previous season and being ranked as high as No. 3 in the nation, the Hoosiers faced a troubling and disappointing year; they finished the 2016–17 season 18–16, 7–11 in Big Ten play to finish in a tie for 10th place. At the Big Ten tournament they defeated Iowa in the second round to advance to the quarterfinals where they lost to Wisconsin. The Hoosiers missed out on the NCAA tournament and lost in the first round of the NIT, their first appearance since 2005, to Georgia Tech. The game was played at Georgia Tech's McCamish Pavilion because Indiana Athletic Director Fred Glass declined to host a home game at Simon Skjodt Assembly Hall citing concern it would "devalue" the Hoosiers' home court.

On March 16, 2017, Indiana fired Crean after nine years as head coach. On March 25, 2017, it was announced that Dayton's Archie Miller was hired as Indiana's 29th head basketball coach. Miller played at NC State and had assistant coaching experience at schools like NC State, Ohio State, and Arizona before coaching Dayton for six years.

Preseason

Departures

Recruiting class
When IU changed head coaches, each of the three original recruits had to be re-recruited by IU's new head coach, Archie Miller. Eventually, all three recruits who had been brought on board by former head coach, Tom Crean, recommitted. On July 16, 2017, Miller was able to land his first IU recruit in freshman Race Thompson. Announced in interviews, Thompson reclassified from the class of 2018 to 2017 and decided to redshirt his freshman year.

Future recruits

2018–19 team recruits

Roster

Schedule and results

|-
!colspan=12 style=| Exhibition

|-
!colspan=12 style=| Regular season

|-
!colspan=12 style=| Big Ten tournament

Player statistics

See also
2017–18 Indiana Hoosiers women's basketball team

References

Indiana Hoosiers men's basketball seasons
Indiana
Indiana
Indiana